The Bradwell was a British 4 wheeled cyclecar made in 1914 by Bradwell & Company based in Folkestone, Kent.

The car had a lightweight single seat body and was powered by a Precision, single cylinder, 3½ hp engine driving the rear wheels by  belts. It cost GBP65.

See also
 List of car manufacturers of the United Kingdom

References 

Cyclecars
Defunct motor vehicle manufacturers of England
Vehicle manufacturing companies established in 1914
Defunct companies based in Kent